D-curve might refer to:
 D-curve (weighting) a weighting curve used for the measurement of sound pressure level.
 D-curve (electricity) a boundary of the reactive power capability of an electrical generator.